Ector can refer to:

 A variation of the name Hector
 Ector, a city in Fannin County, Texas
 Ector County, Texas
 Sir Ector, King Arthur's foster father in medieval legend
 Ector de Maris, half brother of Lancelot